Banika Field was a World War II airfield on Mbanika in the Russell Islands in the Solomon Islands. Banika Field was built and supported by Naval Base Banika Island.

History
A US Navy Seebee Naval Construction Battalion began construction for two airfields on Banika Island in February 1943. Renard Field, also called South Field, Yandina, was built is still in use as Yandina Airport. Nearby Banika Field, also called North Field and Sunlight Field was built. Banika Field was had a single coral 4,700-foot by 150-foot runway built for light bombers and fighter planes. Banika Field was completed in June 1943. After the war, Banika Field was abandoned. 

United States Army Air Forces units operating from the base included: 
Flying North American B-25 Mitchells
2nd BG, HQ (B-25]) October 22, 1943–Aug 7, 44 Hollandia
42nd BG, 390th BS (B-25C)  October 21-43–August 22, 1944 
42nd BG, 75th BS (B-25) October 21, 1943–Jan 20, 1944 
42nd BG, 390th BS (B-25)  October 22, 1943–Aug 7, 1944 
42nd BG, 69th BS (B-25)  November 10, 1943–February 19, 1944 

US Navy operating from the base included:
Special Task Air Group One (STAG-1) (TDR-1 Attack Drone) 
Base LVT Repair Component E20 #1

United States Marine Corps (USMC)
MAG-21 HQ March 1943 - ?
VMF-124 (Vought F4U Corsair-F4U) departed June 17, 1943
VMF-213 (F4U) June 17, 1943–December 9, 1943
VMF-214 (F4U) July 21, 1943–September 17, 1943 
VMF(N)-531 (Lockheed Ventura PV-1) September 11, 1943 - ?
VMSB-144 (Douglas SBD Dauntless SBD) June 25, 1943–July 30, 1943

Interstate TDR
The US Navy used Banika Field to test and operated the new Interstate TDR early Unmanned combat aerial vehicle, at that time called a flying bomb.  The Interstate TDR had one 2,000-pound (910 kg) bomb or one aerial torpedo. This was radio controlled plane. At Banika Field was the first use of the unit in a combat zone. At Banika Field top secret combat test were done. Test were done in June 1944 with troops from Special Task Air Group 1 (STAG-1). The head of the test was Commanding Officer (C. O.) Captain Robert F. Jones.

Renard Sound Seaplane Base
Near Banika Field, in the channel to the east of the runway, the US Navy operated the Renard Sound Seaplane Base. The Base was at

See also
US Naval Advance Bases
Naval Base Brisbane

External links
youtube.com US NAVY WWII TDR-1 DRONE OPERATIONAL TESTS IN SOUTH PACIFIC

References

 

Airfields of the United States Army Air Forces in the Pacific Ocean theatre of World War II